The FIBT World Championships 1963 took place in Igls, Austria for the second time after hosting the event previously in 1935 (Two-man). This event would serve as the test for the Winter Olympics that would take place the following year in neighboring Innsbruck.

Two man bobsleigh

Four man bobsleigh

Medal table

References
2-Man bobsleigh World Champions
4-Man bobsleigh World Champions

1963
1963 in Austrian sport
1963 in bobsleigh
International sports competitions hosted by Austria
Bobsleigh in Austria